Sonoko Sugimoto  was a Japanese novelist. She was best known for writing historical fiction.

Biography 
Sugimoto was born in Ushigome, Tokyo on June 26, 1925. As a child she performed as a stage and radio actor, and practiced traditional Japanese music and dance. She enjoyed books by Natsume Soseki and Mori Ogai. From 1944 to 1945 (during World War II), she worked for the Japanese government. She graduated from Bunka Gakuin with a degree in literature in 1949. She worked at a health center after graduation.

In 1951 and 1952 Sugimoto's first short stories,  and  both won awards from the  magazine. When she won these awards she met Eiji Yoshikawa, and became his only disciple. She studied with him for ten years. Her next work,  earned the Naoki Prize in 1962. 

Sugimoto continued writing historical novels. Two of her novels were adapted into the 1985 Taiga drama, . In 1987 she was awarded the Medal with Purple Ribbon, one of the Japanese Medals of Honor. In 1995 she was recognized as a Person of Cultural Merit. In 2002 she was awarded the Kikuchi Kan Prize and the Order of Culture. Her collected works were published in 1998 as a 22-volume set.

In her later life she moved to Atami, Shizuoka. Sugimoto died on May 31, 2017.

Selected works

References 

1925 births
2017 deaths
20th-century Japanese novelists
People from Tokyo
Naoki Prize winners